Betsi Cadwaladr (24 May 1789 – 17 July 1860), also known as Beti Cadwaladr and Betsi Davis, was a Welsh nurse. She began nursing on travelling ships in her 30s (1820s) and later nursed in the Crimean War alongside Florence Nightingale. Their different social backgrounds was a source of constant disagreement. 

Her name today is synonymous with the Betsi Cadwaladr University Health Board, the largest health organisation in Wales. In 2016, she was named as one of "the 50 greatest Welsh men and women of all time". and was placed ahead of such famous Welsh individuals as the singer Tom Jones, the actor Anthony Hopkins, T.E. Lawrence and Ivor Novello.

Background
Elizabeth 'Betsi' Cadwaladr was born in 1789 at Llanycil, near Bala, Wales, one of 16 children to Methodist preacher Dafydd Cadwaladr.  She grew up on Pen Rhiw Farm, Llanycil, and her mother died when she was only five years old. Very soon after this she was given a copy of the Bible as a present from Thomas Charles (a Welsh Calvinistic Methodist clergyman who had famously also given a copy to Mary Jones), something which Betsi appreciated greatly, and which she felt now gave her some purpose to life.

Her early work
Cadwaladr got employment locally as a maid at Plas yn Dre, where she learned housework, to speak English, and to play the triple harp. She was not happy there, though, and aged 14 she escaped through a bedroom window using tied sheets, and left Bala. She obtained employment as a domestic servant in Liverpool. At some point in her life she changed her surname to Davis because it was easy to pronounce, though some sources state that she was actually born as Elizabeth Davis. She later returned to Wales, but subsequently fled to London to avoid marriage, living with her sister.  Here in London she first encountered the theatre, which became a great interest to her.

Working as a maid and assistant, she had the opportunity to travel widely around the world, which gave her a taste for travel. She was in France at the time of the Battle of Waterloo, and she visited the battlefield where she was moved by the plight of the injured. In 1820, aged 31, she again returned to Bala, which she now considered 'dull', so she became a maid to a ship's captain and travelled for years, visiting such places as South America, Africa and Australia. At times she performed Shakespeare on board ship, and met such people as William Carey, the missionary, and Bishop Heber, the hymn-writer. At this time she was not trained in nursing, but during the course of her time on board ship she became involved in the care of the sick, and she also delivered babies. Despite her stubbornness and independence, Cadwaladr herself claimed that in the course of her travels she was proposed to by over 20 men.

Her work as a nurse
On returning to Britain, she decided to train as a nurse at Guy's, a London hospital. Following her training, at the age of 65 she joined the military nursing service with the intention of working in the Crimea, despite the attempts of her sister Bridget to dissuade her. Florence Nightingale (who came from a privileged background) did not want the Welsh working-class Cadwaladr to go, saying that if Betsi went to the Crimea, it would be against her will, and that Betsi would have to be made over to another superintendent. Betsi responded, "Do you think I am a dog or an animal to make me over? I have a will of my own."

Cadwaladr was subsequently posted to a hospital in Scutari, Turkey, a hospital being run by Florence Nightingale. Cadwaladr worked there for some months, but there were frequent clashes between the two; they came from very different social backgrounds and were a generation apart in age (31 years). Nightingale was a stickler for rules and bureaucracy, some of which she set up; indeed, she was also famed as a statistician. Cadwaladr often side-stepped regulations to react more intuitively to the ever-changing needs of the injured soldiers. Whilst Nightingale subsequently acknowledged Cadwaladr's work and the progress that she made against the unhygienic conditions, the two fell out to such a degree that Cadwaladr, by now aged over 65, moved by choice from the hospital, nearer to the frontline at Balaclava. Here, apart from her nursing work and her supervision of the camp kitchens, she again gained notoriety for her fight with bureaucracy to ensure that necessary supplies got through. Nightingale visited Balaclava twice and, on seeing the changes brought about by Cadwaladr's methods, gave her the credit she was due.

Death

Conditions in the Crimea eventually took their toll on Cadwaladr's health, as she was ill with cholera and dysentery when she returned to Britain in 1855, a year before the war ended. She lived in London, again at her sister's house, during which time she wrote her autobiography. She died in 1860, five years after her return, and was buried in the pauper's section of Abney Park Cemetery in north London. A new memorial stone was placed on her grave in August 2012.

Royal College of Nursing in Wales

On Nurses' Day 2005, as requested by the then RCN Welsh Board Chair, Eirlys Warrington, Donna M Mead addressed the Royal College of Nursing in Wales. The topic was ‘Nursing, Now and Then’. Inevitably, the accomplishments of nursing pioneers such as Florence Nightingale and Mary Seacole were mentioned. It was asserted that it was time that Wales acknowledged its own nursing heroine and Mead, supported by the Royal College of Nursing in Wales, became the leading advocate for celebrating Betsi Cadwaladr’s considerable achievements.

Since 2005 there have been many developments, including the RCN Wales biennial Betsi Cadwaladr Lecture which has been presented by:
 
 2006 Sue Essex AM, who delivered the inaugural lecture 
 2008  Julian Tudor Hart who in the 1970s wrote the inverse care law.
 2010 Julie Morgan MP, now Assembly Member
 2012 Christine Mary Evans, retired consultant urologist 
 2014 Roy Lilley, NHS writer, broadcaster and commentator
 2017 Dame Rosemary Butler, former Assembly member and Presiding Officer, Welsh Assembly

In 2014 a Western Mail survey of the 50 greatest Welsh people of all time rated Betsi Cadwaladr at 38; this was rated higher than notable individuals such as the singer Tom Jones (39), the actor Anthony Hopkins (46), the songwriter Ivor Novello (44) and sportsmen such as Ryan Giggs (50) and John Charles (48).

To commemorate the centenary of International Women's Day in 2011 the National Federation of Women's Institutes - Wales (NFWI-Wales) organised 3 events, one each in Cardiff, Llangollen and Carmarthen. Contributors at each event were asked to select a woman who had been inspirational and to speak about her. Professor Donna Mead, who spoke in Carmarthen selected Betsi Cadwaladr. Following the event, The NFWI-Wales produced a booklet containing the presentations from across Wales. It transpired that Betsi Cadwaladr had also been selected by Gretta Cartwright who spoke in Llangollen, so Betsi had two entries in that publication.

Works
 Autobiography of Elizabeth Davis, 1857. Republished as Betsy Cadwaladyr: A Balaclava Nurse Honno, 2015. 
 Hart, JT (1971). "The Inverse Care Law". Lancet. 1: 405–12. doi:10.1016/s0140-6736(71)92410-x.

References

External links

1789 births
1860 deaths
People from Gwynedd
British people of the Crimean War
Female wartime nurses
Women of the Victorian era
Welsh nurses